Copperstate Farms is a cannabis greenhouse in Snowflake, Arizona. The owner, Fife Symington IV is the son of Fife Symington, who was the state governor in the 1990s.

References

Sources

Buildings and structures in Navajo County, Arizona
Cannabis greenhouses